Dogs from Japan is the twelfth studio album by Crack the Sky.

Track listing

Personnel
Bobby Hird — Guitar
Glenn Workman — Keyboards
John Palumbo — Vocals
John Tracey — Drums
Carey Ziegler — Bass guitar

2004 albums
Crack the Sky albums